A laboratory school or demonstration school is an elementary or secondary school operated in association with a university, college, or other teacher education institution and used for the training of future teachers, educational experimentation, educational research, and professional development.

Many laboratory schools follow a model of experiential education based on the original Laboratory School run by John Dewey at the University of Chicago. Many laboratory schools still operate in the United States and around the globe. They are known by many names: laboratory schools, demonstration schools, campus schools, model schools, university-affiliated schools, child development schools, etc., and most have a connection to a college or university. Each university-affiliated school has a unique relationship with a college or university and a different grade configuration. Some lab schools are only for preschool or kindergarten children, some are preschool through fifth or sixth grade, and some continue through high school.

Khan Lab School in Silicon Valley is one of the few laboratory schools not affiliated with a college or university. It is affiliated with Khan Academy, a non-profit educational organization. The school's experimentation with abolishing grade levels was featured on Voice of America in 2016.

Classroom observation
Laboratory school classrooms may be observed by university professors to assess the student-teacher, but this is conducted without the students or student-teachers aware of the observation. The observers want to avoid creating a distraction or disrupting classroom activities. Before the miniaturization of electronic camera viewing systems, laboratory schools often included elaborate direct-view observation systems with special observation decks above classrooms or observation rooms alongside the classrooms. One-way mirrors and speaker/intercom systems allowed a professor to silently observe the classroom, but without being seen by the students or the student-teacher.

A modern laboratory school is able to use a standard-design school as a laboratory school. The standard rooms are outfitted with CCTV cameras hidden inside black plastic domes on the ceiling. Complex lens optics and multiple cameras allow a single stationary dome to view 360 degrees, with no mechanical noises or moving parts. High-speed Internet connections allow for a professor at a college to remotely view and interact with student-teachers in a distant laboratory school.

In either case students or student-teachers know that observation may occur, but they do not know when such observation takes place.

Examples

Asia

Australia

Canada

Europe

United States

See also
Progressive education
List of demonstration schools in Thailand

References

External links
International Association of Laboratory Schools

 
Progressive education
Types of vocational school